The United Arab Emirates Football Association (UAEFA) is the governing body of association football, beach soccer and futsal in the United Arab Emirates.

Association staff

President 
The following is a list of selected presidents of the United Arab Emirates Football Association including pre-UAEFA era.

Activity
At the level of developing the national cadres, the FA chose 2010 as the Year of the National Coach and signed various agreements with some national associations in the game for development and training including Germany, Spain, Czech, Italy and Egypt. The national coaches took over the youth and junior national teams and they were provided with financial support.

At the organizational level, the FA hosted the FIFA Club World Cups in 2009 and 2010, the 2009 FIFA Beach Soccer World Cup and other friendly and official championships and supported the women football and launched the Futsal in collaboration with sports council within the country. The next step is to organize and host the 2013 FIFA U-17 World Cup.

In 2010, UAEFA partnered with the Mubadala Development Company to launch the UAEFA Grassroots Festivals, a state-wide campaign to recruit and train certain players.

In July 2011, a 3-year sponsoring deal was signed with Panasonic. In January 2016, UAEFA signed a partnership with the United States Sports Academy to provide UAEFA a football club operators licensing program.

In December 2016, UAEFA renewed its partnership with the Japan Football Association.

In February 2017, UAEFA warned 46 football players (including Asamoah Gyan) about their inappropriate hairstyles that did not conform to its guidelines.

In October 2017, UAEFA requested that the 23rd Arabian Gulf Cup be postponed while the issue with Qatar was being resolved.

Management

League system
Tier 1:UAE Pro League
Tier 2:UAE First Division League
Tier 3:UAE Second Division League
Tier 4:UAE Third Division League

Domestic Cups
UAE President's Cup
UAE League Cup
UAE Super Cup

Defunct tournaments
UAE Vice-presidents Cup
UAE Federation Cup

National teams
United Arab Emirates senior, under-23, under-20, under-17 and women's national association football teams
United Arab Emirates national futsal team
United Arab Emirates national beach soccer team

See also
UAE Pro League Committee

References

External links
 
United Arab Emirates at FIFA site
United Arab Emirates at AFC site

Football in the United Arab Emirates
1971 establishments in the United Arab Emirates
United Arab Emirates
Foo
Sports organizations established in 1971